Sudjan (also Romanized as Sūdjān and Sūd Jān; also known as Sayīd-ī-Gan, Sīdgān, Sūdeh Jān, and Sadkan) is a city in Laran District of Shahrekord County, Chaharmahal and Bakhtiari province, Iran. At the 2006 census, its population was 5,415 in 1,214 households. The following census in 2011 counted 5,410 people in 1,442 households. The latest census in 2016 showed a population of 5,581 people in 1,658 households.

References 

Shahrekord County

Cities in Chaharmahal and Bakhtiari Province

Populated places in Chaharmahal and Bakhtiari Province

Populated places in Shahr-e Kord County